La Boum 2 is a 1982 French teen romantic comedy film directed by Claude Pinoteau and starring Claude Brasseur, Brigitte Fossey, and Sophie Marceau. Written by Danièle Thompson and Claude Pinoteau, the film is about a girl who falls in love with a boy and must deal with the question of making love for the first time. La Boum 2 is the sequel to 1980's La Boum (The Party). The music group Cook da Books became famous in many countries through their soundtrack song "Your Eyes". Like its predecessor, La Boum 2 was a financial success, earning 4,071,600 admissions in France. In 1983, the film received the César Award for Most Promising Actress (Sophie Marceau), and was nominated for Best Music (Vladimir Cosma) and Best Supporting Actress (Denise Grey).

Plot
Fifteen-year-old Vic (Sophie Marceau) has no boyfriend. Her parents are happily together again, and her great-grandmother Poupette (Denise Grey) thinks about finally marrying her long-term boyfriend. Vic meets Philippe (Pierre Cosso) and is overcome by his charm. She considers making love with him – a step that her girlfriend Penelope (Sheila O'Connor) already has taken.

Cast
 Sophie Marceau as Victoire "Vic" Beretton
 Claude Brasseur as François Beretton 
 Brigitte Fossey as Françoise Beretton  
 Denise Grey as Poupette, Great-Grandmother
 Pierre Cosso as Philippe Berthier 
 Lambert Wilson as Félix Maréchal 
 Alexandre Sterling as Mathieu 
 Sheila O'Connor as Pénélope Fontanet 
 Alexandra Gonin as Samantha Fontanet
 Jean-Philippe Léonard as Stéphane 
 Jean Leuvrais as Portal 
 Claudia Morin as Mme Fontanet 
 Daniel Russo as Etienne
 Zabou Breitman as Catherine

Production

Soundtrack
 "Your Eyes" (Cosma-Jordan) by Cook da Books – 4:38
 "I Can't Swim" (Cosma-Harvest) by Paul Hudson – 2:25
 "Livin' Together" (Cosma-Jordan) by Cook da Books – 3:35
 "Disillusion" (instrumental) (Cosma) by King Harvest Group – 4:06
 "Maybe You're Wrong" (Cosma-Jordan-Harvest) by Freddie Meyer & King Harvest Group – 3:25
 "Silverman" (Cosma-Jordan) by Cook da Books – 3:38
 "Reaching Out" (Cosma-Harvest) by Freddie Meyer & King Harvest Group – 4:57
 "Rockin’ at the Hop" (Cosma-Jordan) by Paul Hudson – 3:20
 "Silverman" (instrumental) (Cosma) by King Harvest Group – 2:48
 "La boum 2" (instrumental) (Cosma) by King Harvest Group – 3:07

Reception

Box office
Like its predecessor, La Boum 2 was a financial success, earning 4,071,600 admissions in France, and 651,235 admissions in West Germany.

Awards and nominations
 1983 César Award for Most Promising Actress (Sophie Marceau) Won
 1983 César Award Nomination for Best Music (Vladimir Cosma)
 1983 César Award Nomination for Best Supporting Actress (Denise Grey)

References

External links
 
 
 

1982 films
1982 romantic comedy films
1980s coming-of-age comedy films
1980s teen comedy films
1980s teen romance films
Coming-of-age romance films
Films directed by Claude Pinoteau
Films scored by Vladimir Cosma
French coming-of-age comedy films
French romantic comedy films
French sequel films
French teen comedy films
1980s French films